The MKEK-6 was a two-seat training glider designed and built in Turkey by Mechanical and Chemical Industry Corporation (Makina Kimya endustrisi Kurumu) (MKEK), during the early 1950s.

Design and development
The MKEK-6 was a high-wing, two-seat, training glider with a wooden monocoque, circular cross-section fuselage. The wooden-construction wing was a single-spar structure with constant taper in chord and thickness. The tail unit was conventional and the undercarriage consisted of a skid under the fuselage nose, a main-wheel aft of the skid and a tail-skid at the extreme aft end of the fuselage. The enclosed cockpit sat two occupants in side-by-side configuration, with dual controls.

Specifications (MKEK-6)

References

Glider aircraft
Mechanical and Chemical Industry Corporation aircraft